Caroline Knutsen  (born 21 November 1983) is a retired Norwegian footballer who played as a goalkeeper for the Norway women's national football team. She was part of the team at the UEFA Women's Euro 2009 and the 2011 FIFA Women's World Cup. On club level she played for Asker, Vålerenga and Røa in Norway.

In 2016 she became the new head coach of Bærum SK. She lived in Skibotn and Tromsø in her earliest years, but grew up in Kongsvinger and attended the Norwegian School of Elite Sport.

References

External links
 

1983 births
Living people
Sportspeople from Kongsvinger
Sportspeople from Tromsø
Norwegian women's footballers
Norway women's international footballers
2011 FIFA Women's World Cup players
Asker Fotball (women) players
Vålerenga Fotball Damer players
Røa IL players
Women's association football goalkeepers
Norwegian women's football managers